Gary Davies (born 13 December 1957) is a British broadcaster. From 1982 to 1993 he was a BBC Radio 1 disc jockey and a regular presenter of Top of the Pops.

As of September 2022 Gary Davies can be heard on BBC Radio 2 presenting Saturday night show Sounds of the 80s, as well as regularly standing in for other presenters including Zoe Ball, Ken Bruce, Sara Cox, OJ Borg, Dermot O'Leary, Rylan Clark, and Steve Wright.

Early career
After working in marketing for a mail order company and managing a Manchester disco, in the late 70s Gary was a DJ in Placemate 7 Manchester. He regularly hosted artists in Placemate 4 music rooms and began his broadcasting career at Manchester's Piccadilly Radio in 1979 before joining BBC Radio 1 in 1982 to present a Saturday late night show, making his debut on 4 December 1982. Within weeks he was on the roster to present Top of the Pops on BBC television alongside his Radio 1 colleagues.

BBC Radio 1

The Bit in the Middle
In 1984, Davies took over the lunchtime show. He called it The Bit in the Middle which consisted of features, such as 'The Day-To-Day Challenge', in which the same person would go on air each weekday to answer quiz questions and try to upgrade their prize, and 'Willy on the Plonker', which involved crazed piano-playing of a well-known hit for listeners to identify.

On Sunday 6 September 1987 he presented the Sunday afternoon stereo countdown of the Top 40 from 5pm to 7pm, filling in for Bruno Brookes.

Davies was promoted with the catchphrase "Young, Free and Single" and a jingle "Wooh! Gary Davies".

Davies' own show rarely changed until it was rebranded in 1991 as Let's Do Lunch, with new features, including 'Spin & Win' (a variation on 'Willy on the Plonker', with a cryptic clue replacing the frenetic piano work) and the 'Classic Track' featuring a piece of classical music. Previous feature The Sloppy Bit (a dedication followed by love song) was unchanged but renamed 'Lots of Love'. He also introduced 'The Non Stop Half Hour' from after the 2.30pm news until 3pm, which was half an hour of non-stop music.

With updated technology, the chart rundown was moved forward to Sundays from 4 October 1987. Instead, Davies did countdowns of the US chart and the UK album chart – although the US chart he featured was not the official Billboard one, but an airplay-only chart compiled by Radio and Records magazine.

Weekends
In 1992, Davies moved from the lunchtime show to the weekend breakfast, keeping a selection of the features. He also started a Sunday late night slot. The 'Lots of Love' feature moved to this show, with dedications being read out over the music to Dances with Wolves. During this period, he could also be heard deputising for weekday presenters who were taking their holidays, usually Steve Wright or Nicky Campbell.

Leaving BBC Radio 1
In 1993 Davies was dismissed. His last record was Layla by Derek and the Dominoes — which had also been his first record on the station 11 years earlier.

Davies was the last Radio 1 DJ to host Top of the Pops before the show's "year zero" revamp in October 1991.

Virgin Radio
In January 1994, Davies moved to Virgin Radio, presenting their Sunday morning Classic Tracks slot from 10am to 2pm. The show later went out from 9am to 1pm and he remained there until early 1995.

After a brief sabbatical, Davies then rejoined Virgin Radio in December 1995, taking over the Sunday late night show from 10pm to 2am. This gave him the chance to revive his Sunday night format. In 1997, Davies moved to an earlier slot on Sundays from 6-10pm, before moving on to present the weekday late night slot in January 1999, where he remained until December 2000.

Century Radio
Davies was heard on the Real Radio and the Century Network, presenting a CD chart show every Sunday originally from 1 to 4pm but from 2006 the show went out from 4pm to 7pm. However, this finished in mid-2008. Currently he owns a publishing company called Good Groove, where he also manages new artists. Good Groove's first publishing hit was "Black Coffee" by All Saints and Davies later went on to sign singer Corinne Bailey Rae.

BBC Radio 2
On 20 March 2017, during Sara Cox's Sounds of the 80s 24-hour Danceathon for Red Nose Day 2017, Davies was interviewed by Simon Mayo on Simon Mayo Drivetime. and later on 9 June 2017, Davies stood in for Sara Cox to present a special 2¾ hour edition of Sounds of the 80s on BBC Radio 2. This was his first time back on BBC Radio after 23 years away. In October 2017, January & October 2018, and October/November 2020, Davies sat in for Steve Wright's BBC Radio 2 show.

On 18 May 2018, as part of a re-organisation of the Radio 2 DJ roster, following changes to the station's evening line-up, Davies took over from Sara Cox as the new host of Radio 2's Sounds of the 80s. He also provides holiday and sickness cover for fellow Radio 2 presenters including Zoe Ball, Ken Bruce, Sara Cox, OJ Borg, Steve Wright, Dermot O'Leary, and Rylan Clark.

On 24 February 2023, it was announced that Davies would be the temporary presenter of BBC Radio 2's mid-morning show from 6 March, following Ken Bruce's departure from the station until the new permanent presenter Vernon Kay takes over in May.

References

External links
Gary Davies (BBC Radio 2)
Sounds of the 80s with Gary Davies (BBC Radio 2)
Official Website

1957 births
Living people
British radio personalities
Mass media people from Manchester
British Jews
British radio DJs
Virgin Radio (UK)
BBC Radio 1 presenters
BBC Radio 2 presenters
Top of the Pops presenters